"In the Country" is a song by Cliff Richard and the Shadows, released as a single in December 1966. It peaked at number 6 on the UK Singles Chart.

Release and reception
"In the Country" was written by all four members of the Shadows and was included on the pantomime cast album Cinderella. The single was released with the B-side "Finders Keepers", which was the title track from the group's previous soundtrack album.

Reviewed in Disc, "In the Country" was described as "so hideously catchy everyone will be bouncing off the walls to it, whether they want to or not". Peter Jones for Record Mirror wrote that it was "a very strong song" with "the Shads contributing the vocal wordlessness behind Cliff, who fair swings through a rather typical show tune. Has strong grow-on-you appeal".

Track listing
 "In the Country" – 2:38
 "Finders Keepers" – 2:36

Personnel
 Cliff Richard – vocals
 Hank Marvin – lead guitar, backing vocals
 Bruce Welch – rhythm guitar, backing vocals
 John Rostill – bass guitar, backing vocals
 Brian Bennett – drums

Charts

References

1966 singles
1966 songs
Cliff Richard songs
Songs written by Hank Marvin
Songs written by Bruce Welch
Songs written by Brian Bennett
Songs written by John Rostill
Columbia Graphophone Company singles
Song recordings produced by Norrie Paramor